Romanian singer Inna, whose ongoing career started in 2008 with her debut single "Hot", has received various awards and nominations. Born on 16 October 1986 in Mangalia and raised in Neptun, Romania, she met native producing trio Play & Win and adopted a pop-rock style, which was later changed to minimal-infused house music. Inna is the recipient of five Balkan Music Awards, one European Border Breakers Award, three MTV Europe Music Awards for Best Romanian Act and fourteen Romanian Music Awards. Inna's debut studio album Hot, including her breakthrough single of the same name, was released in August 2009 and won the Romanian Music Award for Best Album.

I Am the Club Rocker (2011), Inna's second record, was nominated for the same award at the 2012 Romanian Music Awards. The record featured the commercially successful single "Sun Is Up", which won the Eurodanceweb Award in 2010. It was the first time that a Romanian artist had received the award. Her third album Party Never Ends (2013) was nominated for the Romanian Music Awards for Best Album, and the same year, a collaboration with Moldovan musical project Carla's Dreams on "P.O.H.U.I." received the Media Music Award for Best Zonga. Inna released her eponymous studio album in October 2015, which spawned several singles including "Diggy Down". The song topped the Romanian charts in 2014, and was awarded with Best Dance at the Media Music Awards.

Balkan Music Awards 
The Balkan Music Awards is an annual music award show hosted by Balkanika Music Television. Inna won five out of seven nominations, including Best Song in the Balkans from Romania for 2010 and 2011 for "Sun Is Up" and "Endless", respectively.
 
 
!
|-
!scope="row" rowspan="2"|2010
| Inna
| Best Female Performer in the Balkans 2009
| rowspan="2" 
| rowspan="2"|
|-
| "Love"
| Best Song in the Balkans from Romania for 2009
|-
!scope="row" rowspan="3"|2011
| rowspan="2" |Inna
| Worldwide Breakthrough
|rowspan="5" 
|rowspan="3"|
|-
| Best Female Artist in the Balkans for 2010
|-
| "Sun Is Up"
| Best Song in the Balkans from Romania for 2010
|-
!scope="row" rowspan="2"|2012
| rowspan="1" |Inna
| Best Female Artist in the Balkans for 2011
|rowspan="2"|
|-
| "Endless"
| Best Song in the Balkans from Romania for 2011

Eurodanceweb Award
Inna's "Sun Is Up" won the Eurodanceweb Award in 2010, an online music contest, with 184 points, marking Romania's highest position in that competition. She was ranked in third place by the online voting, but she won following the decision of a jury panel consisting of various journalists, music producers, disc jockeys and radio stations.

!
|-
!scope="row" rowspan="1"|2010
| rowspan="1" |"Sun Is Up"
| Best Song 
|
|

European Border Breakers Awards 
Every year, ten emerging artists or groups who gathered audiences outside their own countries receive a European Border Breakers Award (EBBA). Inna won Romania's first award, with Romanian recording artist and songwriter Alexandra Stan following in 2012.

!
|-
!scope="row" rowspan="1"|2011
| rowspan="1" |Inna
| Romanian Border Award
|
|

Eska Music Awards 
The Eska Music Awards is an annual major Polish awards ceremony for music. While the singer's "Hot" (2008) was nominated for Best International Song in 2008, Inna won in the Artist of the year category the subsequent edition.
 

!
|-
!scope="row" rowspan="1"|2009
| rowspan="1" |"Hot"
| Best International Song 
|
|
|-
!scope="row" rowspan="1"|2010
| rowspan="1" |Inna
| Artist of the year
|
|

Media Music Awards
The Media Music Awards is an annual awards gala based on radio and television airplay data compiled by Media Forest. In 2013, the singer won in the Best Zonga category with "P.O.H.U.I.", a song where she was featured alongside Carla's Dreams. Inna also received another award for Best Dance two years later with "Diggy Down".

!
|-
!scope="row" rowspan="1"|2013
| rowspan="1" |"P.O.H.U.I."
| rowspan="1"|Best Zonga
|rowspan="2" 
|
|-
!scope="row" rowspan="1"|2015
| rowspan="1" |"Diggy Down"
| rowspan="1"|Best Dance
|
|}

MTV Europe Music Awards 
The MTV Europe Music Awards is an event presented by MTV Networks Europe which awards prizes to musicians and performers. Inna is the only singer to win in the Best Romanian Act category twice in a row. As of 2016, she has won that prize three times, and has also been nominated for Best European Act in 2010 and 2015.

!
|-
!scope="row" rowspan="1"|2009
| rowspan="6" |Inna
| rowspan="2"|Best Romanian Act
|rowspan="3" 
|rowspan="3"|
|-
!scope="row" rowspan="3"|2010
|-
| Best Romanian Act
|-
| Best European Act
|
|rowspan="1"|
|-
!scope="row" rowspan="2"|2015
| rowspan="1"|Best Romanian Act
|
|rowspan="2"|
|-
| rowspan="1"|Best European Act
|

NRJ Music Awards 
At the 2011 NRJ Music Awards, an annual French awards gala, Inna was nominated in the International Revelation of the Year category, but ultimately lost in favor of Justin Bieber.

!
|-
!scope="row" rowspan="1"|2011
| rowspan="1" |Inna
| rowspan="1"|International Revelation of the Year
|
|

RRA Awards 
The RRA Awards is a Romanian awards gala which yearly awards prizes based on the votes of a professional jury panel consisting of music critics. Inna won two awards in 2010 and 2011, and one in 2016.

!
|-
!scope="row" rowspan="2"|2010
| Inna
| Best Pop/Dance Act
| rowspan="2" 
|rowspan="2"|
|-
| "Amazing"
| Pop/Dance Song of the Year
|-
!scope="row" rowspan="4"|2011
| rowspan="2" |Inna
| rowspan="1"|Artist of the Year
|rowspan="1" 
|rowspan="4"|
|-
| rowspan="1"|Best Pop/Dance Act
|rowspan="2" 
|-
| rowspan="1" |Hot
| rowspan="1"|Pop/Dance Album of the Year
|-
| rowspan="1" |"Sun Is Up"
| rowspan="1"|Pop/Dance Song of the Year
|rowspan="6" 
|-
!scope="row" rowspan="1"| 2013
| rowspan="1" |Inna
| rowspan="1"|Best Pop/Dance Act
|rowspan="1"|
|-
!scope="row" rowspan="3"|2014
|"In Your Eyes"
|Pop/Dance Song of the Year
|rowspan="3"|
|-
|rowspan="2"|"P.O.H.U.I."
|Song of the Year
|-
|Duet of the Year
|-
!scope="row" rowspan="1"| 2015 
| rowspan="1" |"Cola Song"
| rowspan="2"|Pop/Dance Song of the Year
|rowspan="1"|
|-
!scope="row" rowspan="2"| 2016
| rowspan="1" |"Bop Bop"
| 
|rowspan="2"|
|-
| rowspan="1"|"Diggy Down"
| rowspan="1"|Best Video
|rowspan="4" 
|-
!scope="row" rowspan="3"|2017
|rowspan="3"|"Heaven"
|Song of the Year
|rowspan="3"|
|-
|Pop/Dance Song of the Year
|-
|Big Like

Romanian Music Awards
The Romanian Music Awards is a yearly major Romanian musical event, awarding the best artists in Romania's music scene. Inna won a total of 14 awards out of 30 nominations.

!
|-
!scope="row" rowspan="4"|2009
| rowspan="3" |Inna
| rowspan="1"|Best New Act
|rowspan="4" 
|rowspan="4"|
|-
| rowspan="1"|Best Show
|-
| rowspan="1"|Border Breaker
|-
| rowspan="1" |"Hot"
| rowspan="1"|Best Dance
|-
!scope="row" rowspan="6"|2010
| rowspan="2" |"Amazing"
| rowspan="1"|Best Song
|rowspan="2" 
|rowspan="6"|
|-
| rowspan="1"|Best Dance
|-
| rowspan="1" |Hot
| rowspan="1"|Best Album
|rowspan="8" 
|-
| rowspan="1" |inna.ro
| rowspan="1"|Best Website
|-
| rowspan="5" |Inna
| rowspan="1"|Best Female 
|-
| rowspan="1"|Best International Artist
|-
!scope="row" rowspan="6"|2011
| rowspan="1"|Best Female
| rowspan="6"|
|-
| rowspan="1"|Most Popular Artist 
|-
| rowspan="1"|OK Award 
|-
| rowspan="1" |inna.ro
| rowspan="1"|Best Website
|-
| rowspan="1" |"Sun Is Up"
| rowspan="1"|Best Dance
|rowspan="5" 
|-
| rowspan="1" |"Club Rocker"
| rowspan="1"|Best Video
|-
!scope="row" rowspan="5"|2012
| rowspan="" |I Am the Club Rocker
| rowspan="1"|Best Album
| rowspan="5"|
|-
| rowspan="1" |"Wow"
| rowspan="1"|Best Dance
|-
| rowspan="2" |Inna
| rowspan="1"|Best Female
|-
| rowspan="1"|Best Borderbreaker
|
|-
| rowspan="1" |inna.ro
| rowspan="1"|Best Website
|rowspan="7" 
|-
!scope="row" rowspan="2"|2013
| rowspan="1" |Party Never Ends
| rowspan="1"|Best Album
| rowspan="2"|
|-
| rowspan="1" |Inna
| rowspan="1"|Best on Social Media
|-
!scope="row" rowspan="4"|2014
| rowspan="1" |Party Never Ends
| rowspan="1"|Best Album
| rowspan="4"|
|-
| rowspan="1" |"Cola Song"
| rowspan="1"|Best Video
|-
| rowspan="1" |"Strigă!"
| rowspan="1"|Best Hip-Hop
|-
| rowspan="1" |Inna
| rowspan="1"|Best on Social Media
|-
!scope="row" rowspan="3"|2022
| rowspan="2"|Inna
| Best Border Breaker
| 
| rowspan="3"|
|-
| Best Female
| rowspan="2" 
|-
| "Up"
| Best Dance

References

External links
 

Inna
Awards